Copper Mountain is in North Cascades National Park in the U.S. state of Washington.

References

Mountains of Washington (state)
North Cascades National Park
Mountains of Whatcom County, Washington